Ion Draica (born 5 January 1958) is a retired middleweight Greco-Roman wrestler from Romania. He won the world title in 1978, the European title in 1977–1979 and an Olympic gold medal in 1984.

Draica spent his entire career with the club Farul Constanţa, and after retiring from competitions became its president. In 2000 he was also appointed as president of Romanian Federation of Wrestling. In parallel he was involved in questionable business activities, which resulted in large debts and divorce with his wife Daniela.

References

External links
 

1958 births
Living people
Olympic wrestlers of Romania
Wrestlers at the 1980 Summer Olympics
Wrestlers at the 1984 Summer Olympics
Romanian male sport wrestlers
Olympic gold medalists for Romania
Olympic medalists in wrestling
World Wrestling Championships medalists
Medalists at the 1984 Summer Olympics
Universiade medalists in wrestling
Universiade gold medalists for Romania
European Wrestling Championships medalists
Medalists at the 1977 Summer Universiade
20th-century Romanian people